State Route 106 (SR 106) is a primary state highway in the U.S. state of Virginia.  The state highway runs  from U.S. Route 460 and US 460 Business in Petersburg north to SR 249 in Talleysville.  SR 106 connects Prince George County in the southern part of the Richmond–Petersburg metropolitan area with Charles City and New Kent counties on the Virginia Peninsula via the Benjamin Harrison Memorial Bridge over the James River.

Route description

SR 106 begins at a four-way intersection in the southeastern corner of the independent city of Petersburg.  US 460 heads west as Wagner Road toward Interstate 95 (I-95) and southeast as County Drive toward Suffolk.  County Drive heads north as US 460 Business toward downtown Petersburg.  SR 106 heads northeast as Courthouse Road, which exits the intersection as a four-lane divided highway but reduces to a two-lane undivided road as the highway leaves Petersburg and enters Prince George County.  The state highway heads northeast to the county seat of Prince George, where the highway meets SR 634 (Allin Road) at a roundabout.  SR 106 passes under I-295 with no access and passes by the county courthouse and offices.  The state highway leaves Prince George and heads northeast to Prince George Drive, which heads south as SR 156 and north as SR 156 Business toward the city of Hopewell.

SR 106 and SR 156 run concurrently northeast as Ruffin Road, which bypasses Hopewell to the south and east.  The two highways intersect SR 10 (James River Drive) and turn east to run concurrently with the four-lane divided highway to its next intersection with Jordan Point Road.  SR 106 and SR 156 turn north onto two-lane undivided Jordan Point Road, which leads to Jordan Point.  There, the two highways cross the James River on the Benjamin Harrison Memorial Bridge, a vertical-lift bridge that is named for Benjamin Harrison V, the father of William Henry Harrison and great-grandfather of Benjamin Harrison.  The two highways enter Charles City County as Roxbury Road, which they follow north to SR 5 (John Tyler Memorial Highway).  SR 156 turns west with SR 5 while SR 106 continues north to the village of Roxbury, where the highway has a grade crossing with CSX's Peninsula Subdivision.

SR 106 crosses the Chickahominy River into New Kent County and intersects US 60 (Pocahontas Trail).  The state highway continues northeast as Emmaus Church Road and has a diamond interchange with I-64 and SR 33.  North of the Interstate, SR 106 passes through a roundabout with a pair of stub roads and expands to a four-lane divided highway that passes through a developing residential subdivision.  The state highway passes through another roundabout with the incomplete roads of the subdivision before reaching its northern terminus at a roundabout with SR 249 (New Kent Highway) in Talleysville.  The north leg of the intersection is SR 609 (Old Church Road), which leads to St. Peter's Church.

Major intersections

References

External links

Virginia Highways Project: VA 106

106
State Route 106
State Route 106
State Route 106
State Route 106